Hillside Dams also called Hillside Dams Conservancy is a national monument of Zimbabwe located in the city of Bulawayo.

History 
The Hillside Dams area history dates back to the Stone Age as there were various Stone Age tools and rock shelters discovered within the area. In the 19th century it was one of King Lobengula's favourite villages to relax at. In 1895 Rhodesian workers started constructing infrastructure for commercial water supply. It was then that the name Hillside Dams was adopted after completion of the structures in 1898. Unfortunately the structure collapsed.

In 1924 the Hillside Dams were sold to Bulawayo City Council, and the dams for water supply were changed. Thereafter the area became a low density residential suburb known as Hillside. In 1942 Hillside Dams was designated as a National Monument.

Features

Flora 
The woodland vegetation of Hillside Dams is mainly dominated by Terminalia, Acacia, Burkea, Sclerocarya and Peltophorum. The trees are labelled by numbers and you can  refer somewhere to the meanings of the numbers. There is also an Aloe Garden with different types of Aloe vera.

Fauna 
Hillside Dams is a proclaimed bird sanctuary, but has few mammals.

Geology 
The dominant rock in the area is Syenite. There are a lot of kopjes and scattered rock boulders.

Recreational Activities 

 Canoeing 
 Ziplining 
 Barbecuing
 Fishing 
 Nature Walk 
 Picnics

External links 
 Official Website

References